Gool is a town in Ramban district of Jammu and Kashmir, India with a population of around 50000. It is situated 52 km from Ramban town and around 180 km from Jammu & Srinagar Bus stand. Kashmiri language is mainly spoken by the people of Gool. The beauty of nature is also seen in Gool in Chenab Valley. It falls in Gool-Gulabgarh area of the Chenab Valley. It is surrounded by mountains. Gool has its own market. It is a developing town.  it is in jammu division. Lush green meadows gushing water green pastures are the natural assets of this place it has a famous ancient site called gohra galli which is believed to be of the time of mahabharata. Giant sculptures and horses personally carved by pandavas out of monolithic stones this unique ancients site is the new tourist attraction. It is recognised by State archilogical department but further excavation is needed. Daggan top and ARAMKUND are other tourist attraction sites which have beautiful meadows and greenpasture land.
Dharam is part Gool.

District Development Council Ramban 
Dr. Shamshada Shan was elected Chairperson of District Development Council Ramban in 2021. She was earlier elected District Development Council Member from Sangaldan constituency in 2020 and Mrs. Rabiya Beigh was elected her deputy.

Sakhi Mohd was elected District Development Council Member from Gool constituency in 2020.

Block Development Council Gool 
Shakeela Akhter was elected Block Development Council Chairperson in 2019.

Transportation
Gool lies 52 km from Ramban. Transportation services are available from Jammu to Gool, Ramban to Gool & Sangaldan to Gool.

Ramban firing incident
The Ramban firing incident refers to the shooting on a protesting crowd of Kashmiri people by J&K police local SHO on 18 July 2013 in the Dharam (Block) area of Gool, Ramban district, Jammu and Kashmir. Four people were killed (including Manzoor Ahmed Shan, Javed Manhas)  and 44 were injured, according to official sources, although residents claimed that six had been killed.

On June 15, 1997, Ashok Raina, principal of a higher secondary school, along with two teachers were killed by HM terrorists. Their crime was spreading light of education in that area.

References

Cities and towns in Ramban district